Bodb may refer to:
 Bodb Derg, Goidelic god
 Badb, goddess